Hard & Hot (Best of Bon Jovi) is the first compilation album by American glam metal band Bon Jovi, released exclusively in Australia in 1991.

Overview
The album featured tracks from the band's first three albums, and although it did not enter the ARIA top 100 albums chart, it peaked at number 44 on the Australian Music Report albums chart and remained in the top 100 for seven weeks. The album exposed tracks from the band's first two albums, Bon Jovi and 7800° Fahrenheit, to the Australian market for the first time as both albums failed to chart upon their original release in 1984 and 1985, respectively.

Track listing
"Shot Through the Heart"
"Runaway"
"She Don't Know Me"
"Breakout"
"In and Out of Love"
"King of the Mountain"
"Tokyo Road"
"Always Run to You"
"(I Dont Wanna Fall) To the Fire"
"You Give Love a Bad Name"
"Livin' on a Prayer"
"Wanted Dead or Alive"
"I'd Die for You"
"Never Say Goodbye"

Personnel
Jon Bon Jovi - lead vocals, acoustic guitar
Richie Sambora - guitar, backing vocals
Tico Torres - drums, percussion
David Bryan - keyboards, backing vocals
Alec John Such - bass guitar, backing vocals
Hugh McDonald - bass on "Runaway" and "Livin' on a Prayer" (uncredited)

References

Bon Jovi compilation albums
1991 compilation albums